Wanning railway station  is a railway station on the Hainan eastern ring high-speed railway, serving the county-level city of Wanning, located in Hainan, China.

External links

Railway stations in Hainan